Dr. Mario Diena (6 July 1891 – 4 November 1971) was an Italian philatelist who was added to the Roll of Distinguished Philatelists in 1956.

References

Signatories to the Roll of Distinguished Philatelists
1891 births
1971 deaths
Italian philatelists